The Lancair Mako is an American amateur-built aircraft designed and produced by Lancair of Uvalde, Texas, introduced at AirVenture in 2017. The aircraft was first flown on 18 July 2017 and is supplied as a kit for amateur construction. It is named after the shark.

The Mako was the first new design from Lancair since the company's purchase by Mark and Conrad Huffstutler and the company's relocation to Texas from Redmond, Oregon in 2017. The design is a development of the Lancair IV and Lancair ES and is related to the Columbia 300 and the later Cessna 400.

The design was intended to compete with the type certified Cirrus SR22 and the now out-of-production Cessna TTx, with higher performance for half the price.

Design and development

The aircraft features a cantilever low-wing, a four-seat enclosed cabin accessed by doors, tricycle landing gear with an optional automatic retractable fully castering nose wheel, main landing gear with wheel pants and a single engine in tractor configuration.

The optional retractable nose gear automatically retracts when the onboard sensors measure the airspeed over 100 knots, 1,000 feet above the ground, throttle position above 30% power, weight off the wheels and flap position up. All five parameters must be met for the nose wheel to retract. Retracting the nosewheel increases cruise speed by up to 12 knots, due to its location in the disturbed air of the propeller slipstream. The system is fully automatic; there is no cockpit selection lever.

The aircraft is made from composites. The wing mounts flaps. The standard engines used are the  Lycoming IO-540, the  Continental IO-550, the turbocharged  Lycoming TIO-540 and the turbocharged  Continental TSIO-550 four-stroke powerplants for the T-Mako turbocharged version. A Ballistic Recovery Systems ballistic parachute is optional.

A center stick or side stick are optional, as is a ThermaWing heated wing or TKS weeping wing ice protection systems, air conditioning and heated seats.

The company's Builder Assistance program is included with the kit purchase price.

Kit production commenced in January 2018, with an initial goal of producing one kit per month.

Operational history
In a 2017 flight test review Aircraft Owners and Pilots Association Pilot Editor at Large, Dave Hirschman described the design noting, "the Mako’s first impression is that it’s big and sleek—like its shark namesake. It strongly resembles a Lancair IV because the two models use the same fuselage and retractable nosewheel ... The Mako is sleek and appealing on the outside—and it’s comfortable, roomy, with good visibility and terrific avionics on the inside." Hirchman was critical of the nose gear retraction automation, saying, "Personally, I’d prefer either fixed or fully retractable landing gear. Call me old-fashioned, but if the gear moves, I want to have a lever for that—even though I recognize I’m less reliable than software."

Flying Magazine reviewer, Pia Bergqvist, flew the design in 2018 and wrote, "Flying the Mako is simply a joy. While the control feel could be a bit lighter (something Conrad is working on), it is a solid platform that will help the pilot stay out of trouble. I tried to get the airplane to stall but couldn’t get it to break. With Conrad’s help, we brought it to 56 knots, 6 knots below the red line on the airspeed indicator. An AOA gauge popped up automatically on the G3X, and it was well in the red. There was no tendency for the nose or a wing to drop as we floated downward at about 1,000 fpm."

Specifications (T-Mako)

See also
List of aerobatic aircraft

References

External links

Lancair aircraft
2010s United States sport aircraft
2010s United States civil utility aircraft
Single-engined tractor aircraft
Low-wing aircraft
Homebuilt aircraft
Aircraft first flown in 2017